Barend Mons (born 1957, The Hague) is a molecular biologist by training and a leading FAIR data specialist. The first decade of his scientific career he spent on fundamental research on malaria parasites and later on translational research for malaria vaccines. In the year 2000 he switched to advanced data stewardship and (biological) systems analytics. He is currently a professor in Leiden and most known for innovations in scholarly collaboration, especially nanopublications, knowledge graph based discovery and most recently the FAIR data initiative and GO FAIR. Since 2012 he is a Professor in biosemantics in the Department of Human Genetics at the  Leiden University Medical Center (LUMC) in The Netherlands. In 2015 Barend was appointed chair of the High Level Expert Group on the European Open Science Cloud. Since 2017 Barend is heading the International Support and Coordination office of the GO FAIR initiative. He is also the elected president of CODATA, the standing committee on research data related issues of the International Science Council. Barend is a member of the Netherlands Academy of Technology and Innovation(ACTI). He is also the European representative in the Board on Research Data and Information (BRDI) of the National Academies of Science for engineering and medicine in the USA. Barend is a frequent keynote speaker about FAIR and open science around the world, and participates in various national and international boards.

Education 
Mons was awarded a Masters (1981 Cum Laude) and a PhD (1986) from Leiden University on cellular and molecular biology of the malaria parasite  Plasmodium berghei, and has worked for more than ten years on the genetic differentiation of malaria parasites and vaccine research, publishing over 45 research articles. After switching to biosemantics he published some 80 papers on this area, many of them highly cited.

Past career
In 1993 Mons joined the European Commission as a Seconded National Expert with the task to develop and support international scientific networks, especially with developing countries as partners. While at the EC, in the early days of the internet, he pioneered one of the first electronic interactive communication systems for science networking with developing countries, SHARED, for which he started to (co-)design thesaurus-based concept extraction technologies in order to match across languages and jargon. From 1996 to 1999 he served the Netherlands Organization for Scientific Research (The National Research Council, NWO) as a senior advisor on International Health Research. After leaving NWO he co-founded the SME Collexis B.V. (later acquired by Elsevier Science) and also started the first Biosemantics Group at the Erasmus Medical Center in Rotterdam. In addition to his research and teaching responsibilities, Mons has remained involved in international scientific management and networking at various levels. After leaving Collexis in 2005 he co-founded Knewco, Inc. in 2006, and more recently, part of his intellectual legacy was the basis for the founding of the successful SME Euretos, focused on advanced machine learning over machine readable data, now also being used for academic research purposes. From 2008, Barend served as a scientific director of the Netherlands Bioinformatics Centre, the predecessor of the current Dutch Techcentre for the Life Sciences (DTL), which he co-founded. DTL was one of the initial supporters of the FAIR data concept. He served as the ‘Integrator for Life Sciences’ in the Netherlands e- Science Center from its inception till 2016, where he was one of the initiators of an early white paper: Data-Stewardship in the Big Data Era: Taking Care of Data (2013). Barend was one of the designers and coordinators of the transformational Innovative Medicines Initiative (IMI) project known as Open PHACTS, pioneering the use of semantic technologies, nanopublications and micro-attributions in pharmaceutical biomedical research. From 2013 to 2015 he acted as Head of Node of the Dutch Node in ELIXIR. In 2014, he initiated the FAIR Data initiative and in 2015 he was appointed Chair of the High Level Expert Group for the European Open Science Cloud. From 2017-2020, he served as the scientific director of the International Support and Coordination Office in the GO FAIR initiative.

Present activities
His present research activities in LUMC mainly focus on open science, and international knowledge sharing and networking. A more specific aim in his research group is to realise a new form of computer-assisted distributed annotation and learning and on-line knowledge discovery, based on the semantic technologies that his research yielded over the years, including nanopublications. Since 2017 his main task has been to set up and lead the international initiative Global Open FAIR (GO FAIR), which is aimed at implementing the FAIR guiding principles in order to create an ‘Internet for Machines’ to support open science and innovation. In his capacity of president of CODATA, he works with an international executive committee to support open science data policies and practices. Barend published the handbook Data Stewardship for Open Science, Implementing FAIR Principles, which is functionally integrated with an on line stewardship wizard. He is currently the Scientific Director of the GO FAIR Foundation.

References

1957 births
Living people
Dutch bioinformaticians
Dutch molecular biologists
Academic staff of Erasmus University Rotterdam
Leiden University alumni
Academic staff of Leiden University
Scientists from The Hague